Chinese North Korean or North Korean Chinese may refer to:
China–North Korea relations, the foreign relations between the People's Republic of China and the Democratic People's Republic of Korea
North Koreans in China
Ethnic Chinese in North Korea
Mixed race people of Chinese and North Korean descent